Ibrahim Nagi (1898–1953) was an Egyptian polymath; a poet, author, translator, and practicing medical doctor. He was among the contributors of Al Siyasa, newspaper of the Liberal Constitutional Party.

Early life
Nagi was also a doctor in internal medicine. Nagi's most famous poem is Al-Atlal or The Ruins which was eventually sung by Egyptian singer Om Kalthoom. He was a co-founder of the Cairo Society for Romantic Poetry. He married Samia Sami and had three daughters: Amira (who had a daughter, Samia Mehrez, and a son, Mohammed), Dawheya (who went to live in America and had a son- Ahmad, and a daughter- Shahira), and Mohassen.

Bibliography

 Behind the Fog, 1934.
 In the Temple of the Night, 1948.
 Cairene Nights, 1951.
 The Bird Wounded, 1953.

The legacy of Ibrahim Nagi in the literary studies

The poetry of Ibrahim Nagi is an object of studies of several literary critics. Nagi's legacy was noted by Abdul Rahman Ghazi al Gosaibi, Hasan Tawfiq and Saleh Jawdat.

External links 
 Arabic News article on Nagi

References

Egyptian male poets
1898 births
1953 deaths
20th-century Egyptian poets
Writers from Cairo
20th-century male writers
Physicians from Cairo